
Prudnik County is a unit of territorial administration and local government (powiat) in Opole Voivodeship, south-western Poland, on the Czech border. It came into being on January 1, 1999, as a result of the Polish local government reforms passed in 1998.

As of 2019 its total population is 55,325, out of which the population of Prudnik is 21,041, that of Głogówek is 5,592, that of Biała is 2,426, and the rural population is 26,266.

Neighbouring counties
Prudnik County is bordered by Nysa County to the north-west, Opole County to the north, Krapkowice County and Kędzierzyn-Koźle County to the east, and Głubczyce County to the south-east. It also borders the Czech Republic to the south.

Administrative division
The county is subdivided into four gminas (three urban-rural and one rural). These are listed in the following table, in descending order of population.

References

 
Prudnik